Federal Highway 166 (Carretera Federal 166) is a Federal Highway of Mexico. The highway travels from north of Axixintla, Guerrero near Grutas de Cacahuamilpa National Park in the west to Alpuyeca, Morelos in the east.

References

166